Omega No. 5 is the latest material by the punk band Scaterd Few. It was released in 2002 on Allan's own label, Accidental Sirens. Unlike on their 1998 release the band returns to its original punk stylings, mirroring Sin Disease in both aureal intensity and lyrical depth. Forming the band on this release are Allan Aguirre and Greyskull members Brad Bevill and Chris Smyers.

Track listing
 "Run If You Can"
 "Resistance"
 "Fair Is He"
 "This Is..."
 "Rise Up!"
 "Parental Advisory"
 "Anybody - Everybody"
 "Shark Attack"
 "Camel Crawl"
 "Tomorrow"
 "Only"
 "Sleeper"
 "Life Bleeds Out"
 "Sheol"
 "Secret - Secret"
 "Hidden Track"

Personnel 

Allan Aguirre: guitar, vocals, drums
Brad Bevill: guitar, background vocals
Chris Smyers: bass, background vocals
Also featuring:
Letha Gaines: vocals on "Rise Up"

References

External links
Samples:
''Run If You Can"
This is...
Rise Up!
Sleeper

Video clips from studio sessions:
Crumbie 1
Crumbie 2
Crumbie 3

2002 albums
Scaterd Few albums